The Church of la Natividad de Nuestra Señora (Spanish: Iglesia de la Natividad de Nuestra Señora) is a church located in San Martín de la Vega, Spain. It was declared Bien de Interés Cultural in 1996.

Built in the 16th-18th centuries in Herrerian style, it has a rectangular plan, with a single nave, chapels and a sacristy.

References 

18th-century Roman Catholic church buildings in Spain 
Natividad de Nuestra Senora, San Martin De La Vega
Bien de Interés Cultural landmarks in the Community of Madrid
Herrerian architecture